is a Japanese politician of the Constitutional Democratic Party of Japan and a member of the House of Representatives in the Diet (national legislature). Kamiya represents Hokkaido through the Hokkaido PR block.

Kamiya first ran for office in the 2014 election as the DPJ candidate for the Hokkaido 10th district, losing against the incumbent Hisashi Inatsu. He would have a rematch with Inatsu in the 2017 general election. This time, he lost by a very narrow margin of 513 votes, making Hokkaido-10th one of the most marginal seats in the country. Nonetheless, Kamiya obtained enough votes to be elected through the CDP's PR block list.

Before running for public office, Kamiya worked as a secretary in the offices of Councillor Eri Tokunaga and Representative Tadamasa Kodaira. He also previously worked in a fisheries cooperative.

References

External links 
 Profile in Japanese.

1968 births
Living people
Politicians from Hokkaido
Members of the House of Representatives (Japan)
Constitutional Democratic Party of Japan politicians
Democratic Party of Japan politicians
21st-century Japanese politicians